Dorovatka is a rural locality (a village) in Turovetskoye Rural Settlement, Mezhdurechensky District, Vologda Oblast, Russia. The population was 2 as of 2002.

Geography 
Dorovatka is located 258 km northeast of Shuyskoye (the district's administrative centre) by road. Nizhny Pochinok is the nearest rural locality.

References 

Rural localities in Mezhdurechensky District, Vologda Oblast